Amos Goldberg is a professor in the Department of Jewish History and Contemporary Jewry at the Hebrew University of Jerusalem and a fellow of the Van Leer Jerusalem Institute, also sitting on the institute's editorial board. He opposes the Working Definition of Antisemitism, saying that "It has become a tool to silence any criticism of Israeli politics, it has become a tool to silence free speech". Instead, he supports the Jerusalem Declaration on Antisemitism.

Works

References

Academic staff of the Hebrew University of Jerusalem
Historians of the Holocaust
Living people
Year of birth missing (living people)